This article contains a list of named passenger trains in the United States, with names beginning I through M.

I

J

K

L

M

References

North America (I-M)
 I-M
Named passenger trains